KATB (89.3 FM) is a radio station broadcasting a religious radio format. Licensed to Anchorage, Alaska, United States, it serves the Anchorage area.  The station is currently owned by Christian Broadcasting, Inc.

Repeaters/Translators
KJLP 88.9 FM and K202CB 88.3 FM in Palmer, Alaska 
K206AO 89.1 FM in Eagle River, Alaska
K283AZ 104.5 FM in Anchorage, Alaska (translator for KJLP)

External links
 
 
 
 
 
 
 
 

1986 establishments in Alaska
Radio stations established in 1986
ATB
ATB